El Pont de Vilomara i Rocafort is a municipality in the province of Barcelona and autonomous community of Catalonia, Spain.

The municipality comprises the settlements of El Pont de Vilomara (1998 population 2,111), Rocafort (55), and River Parc (36).

Notable people
Jonathan Soriano (born 1985), professional footballer

References

External links
 Government data pages 

Municipalities in Bages